Flucetorex (INN) is an amphetamine. It was investigated as an anorectic, but does not appear to have ever been marketed. It is related to fenfluramine.

See also
 Benfluorex
 Fludorex
 Tiflorex

References

Acetamides
Substituted amphetamines
Anorectics
Trifluoromethyl compounds
Serotonin releasing agents
Abandoned drugs